Winter Jam Tour Spectacular, also referred to as simply Winter Jam (and formerly known as January Jam from 1995 to 2000), is an annual American music tour featuring contemporary Christian music artists of all genres, stunt and/or comedy performances, as well as a tour speaker. It is the United States' largest annual Christian Music Tour.

Conceived and created in 1995, as "January Jam", by contemporary Christian music group NewSong and produced and promoted by the promotions company, Premier Productions, Winter Jam has run annually since 1995. From its inception in 1995 through the most recent 2019 tour, the Winter Jam Tour Spectacular has toured all over the United States of America. Tickets are not required for the tour, as a $10 general admission is collected at the door of each arena, though this was raised to a $15 suggested donation in 2018. In 2010 the tour was rated the number two tour in the world. As of April 2011, they reported more than half a million in total attendance for the Winter Jam Tour Spectacular 2011, first quarter, attendance, and 90,000 "decisions for Christ" for. The tour outpaced attendance for all other tours in the first quarter of 2011, including Bon Jovi, U2, X Factor Live, Lady Gaga, Brad Paisley and Justin Bieber, according to Pollstar's 2011 Worldwide First Quarter Ticket Sales "Top 100 Tour" chart.

In 2011, Winter Jam started doing the West Coast Tour in November of each year until 2018. The two tours were later combined to have both West Coast and East Coast in 2023.

Artist Lineup By Year (East Coast)

Artist Lineup By Year (West Coast)

References

External links 
 

 
Recurring events established in 1995
Rock festivals in the United States
Christian music festivals
Christian concert tours